Amir Abdur-Rahim (born March 18, 1981) is a former American basketball player and current coach. He is the head coach of the Kennesaw State Owls men's basketball team.

Playing career
Amir Abdur-Rahim played at Joseph Wheeler High School in Marietta, Georgia.

After one season at Garden City Community College, Abdur-Rahim transferred to Southeastern Louisiana where he was a three-time All-Southland Conference selection playing for Billy Kennedy. He graduated seventh all-time in career points and second all-time in three-pointers made and steals.

Coaching career
Abdur-Rahim began coaching in 2006 serving as a graduate assistant at Murray State for two seasons under Kennedy before being promoted to a full-time assistant coach. He stayed with the Racers until 2011, when he joined the staff at Georgia Tech as the director of player development for one season before becoming an assistant coach at the College of Charleston in 2012. Abdur-Rahim reunited with Kennedy as an assistant coach at Texas A&M from 2014 to 2018 where he was on staff for two of the Aggies' Sweet 16 appearances. In 2018, he returned to his home state to join Tom Crean's staff at Georgia.

On April 18, 2019 Abdur-Rahim was named the head coach at Kennesaw State, replacing Al Skinner.

In the 2022–23 season, Abdur-Rahim led Kennesaw State to their first winning season in their Division I program history, with a record of 23–8. The Owls also won their first Atlantic Sun title and went to their first NCAA Divsiion I tournament. As a result, he was named the 2023 ASUN Coach of the Year.

Personal life
Abdur-Rahim is one of 13 siblings. His brother Shareef played 13 years in the NBA, and is the current president of the NBA G League. He's also the uncle of Shareef's son Jabri Abdur-Rahim.

Head coaching record

References

1981 births
Living people
American men's basketball coaches
Basketball coaches from Georgia (U.S. state)
Basketball players from Atlanta
College men's basketball head coaches in the United States
College of Charleston Cougars men's basketball coaches
Garden City Broncbusters men's basketball players
Georgia Bulldogs basketball coaches
Kennesaw State Owls men's basketball coaches
Murray State Racers men's basketball coaches
Southeastern Louisiana Lions basketball players
Texas A&M Aggies men's basketball coaches